John Prendergast may refer to:

 John Prendergast (activist) (born 1963), American human rights activist
 John Prendergast (artist) (1815–?), British born painter
 John Prendergast (British Army officer) (1910–2008), British army officer
 John Robert Prendergast, Canadian football player (died 2016)
 John Barry Prendergast (1933–2011), better known as John Barry (composer), composer of film soundtracks, including many James Bond films
 John Patrick Prendergast (1808–1893), Irish historian
 John Prendergast (priest) (fl. 1583–1610), Dean of Lismore and prebendary of Cashel